George Ponsonby (5 March 17558 July 1817), was a British lawyer and Whig politician. He served as Lord Chancellor of Ireland from 1806 to 1807 in the Ministry of All the Talents.

Background and education
Ponsonby was the second surviving son of the Honourable John Ponsonby, speaker of the Irish House of Commons (1756–71), and his wife, Lady Elizabeth Cavendish (1723–1796), daughter of William Cavendish, 3rd Duke of Devonshire. He was educated at Kilkenny College and at Trinity College, Cambridge.

Legal and political career
A barrister, Ponsonby became a member of the Irish Parliament in 1776. He sat for Wicklow Borough between 1778 and 1783 and subsequently for Inistioge between 1783 and 1797. From 1798 until the Act of Union in 1801, he represented Galway Borough. Ponsonby was Chancellor of the Irish Exchequer  in 1782, afterwards taking a prominent part in the debates on the question of Roman Catholic relief, and leading the opposition to the union of the parliaments.

After 1801 Ponsonby represented Wicklow and then Tavistock in the Parliament of the United Kingdom; in 1806 to 1807 he was Lord Chancellor of Ireland, and from 1808 to 1817 he was the recognised leader of the opposition in the British House of Commons.

Ponsonby had been selected as the first recognised leader of the opposition, rather than leader of an opposition, when the two leading Whig peers Lord Grenville and Earl Grey, proposed him to Whig MPs. Ponsonby was described by Foorde as "a little-known mediocrity who was related to Lady Grey". He proved to be a weak leader, but was unwilling to resign and so retained the leadership of the party in the House of Commons until his death. He was succeeded as party leader by George Tierney.

Personal life
In Dublin, he was a member of Daly's Club.

He married Lady Mary Butler, the daughter of Brinsley Butler, 2nd Earl of Lanesborough and his wife Lady Jane Rochfort. He left an only daughter, Elizabeth, when he died in London on 8 July 1817, who went on to marry Francis Aldborough Prittie, MP, by whom she had six children.

References 

 Parliamentary Election Results in Ireland, 1801–1922, edited by B. M. Walker (Royal Irish Academy 1978)
 His Majesty's Opposition 1714–1830, by Archibald S. Foorde (Oxford University Press 1964)

External links 
 

1755 births
1817 deaths
People educated at Kilkenny College
Alumni of Trinity College, Cambridge
Irish MPs 1776–1783
Irish MPs 1783–1790
Irish MPs 1790–1797
Irish MPs 1798–1800
Lord chancellors of Ireland
Members of the Privy Council of the United Kingdom
Members of the Privy Council of Ireland
Members of the Parliament of the United Kingdom for County Wicklow constituencies (1801–1922)
Members of the Parliament of the United Kingdom for Tavistock
George Ponsonby
UK MPs 1801–1802
UK MPs 1802–1806
UK MPs 1807–1812
UK MPs 1812–1818
Whig (British political party) MPs for Irish constituencies
Whig (British political party) MPs for English constituencies
Members of the Parliament of Ireland (pre-1801) for County Wicklow constituencies
Members of the Parliament of Ireland (pre-1801) for County Kilkenny constituencies
Members of the Parliament of Ireland (pre-1801) for County Galway constituencies